Jasmit Singh Phulka (born October 11, 1993) is a Canadian freestyle wrestler. He is currently ranked 32 by UWW. In 2018, Phulka debuted at the World Wrestling Championships which was held in Budapest.

Early life and career 
Phulka was born and raised in Abbotsford, British Columbia. He is the son of Harjit Singh and Supinderjit Kaur Phulka. His elder brother, Chanmit is also a Pan American Champion wrestler. Phulka began his wrestling career at a young age of 10.

Jasmit Phulka's first medal in the seniors' category was in 2013 Commonwealth Wrestling Championship which was held in Johannesburg. He represented Canada in the 84 kg weight class and won bronze.

2018 was a pivotal year in his seniors' career as he won three medals. It was a gold, a silver and a bronze in the 2018 Sassari Cup, 2018 Grand Prix of Spain, and 2018 Mongolia Cup respectively. They were all in the 74 kg weight class.

Phulka won the 74-kg title at the Canadian Wrestling Trials that was conducted in December 2019.

In November 2020, Cyclone Regional Training Center announced that Phulka will be a part of them as he is training to represent Canada in the 2020 Olympics.

Phulka missed out on the chance of qualifying for the 2020 Olympics as he lost to Franklin Gomez 10–7 in the quarter final and was only able to secure the bronze medal in the 2020 Pan American Wrestling Olympic Qualification Tournament.

He competed in the 74kg event at the 2022 World Wrestling Championships held in Belgrade, Serbia.

References

External links 
 

1993 births
Living people
Canadian Sikhs
Canadian sportspeople of Indian descent
Canadian people of Punjabi descent
People from Abbotsford, British Columbia
Sportspeople from British Columbia
Canadian male sport wrestlers
Wrestlers at the 2022 Commonwealth Games
Commonwealth Games medallists in wrestling
Commonwealth Games bronze medallists for Canada
21st-century Canadian people
Medallists at the 2022 Commonwealth Games